Karmachhara Legislative Assembly constituency is one of the 60 Legislative Assembly constituencies of Tripura state in India.

It is part of Dhalai district and is reserved for candidates belonging to the Scheduled Tribes.

Members of the Legislative Assembly

Election results

2018

See also
 List of constituencies of the Tripura Legislative Assembly
 Dhalai district

References

Dhalai district
Assembly constituencies of Tripura